Idsworth is an isolated hamlet, with mediaeval Saxon origins, in the East Hampshire district and South Downs National Park in Hampshire, England. Formerly the centre of a Norman manor, its small population means the place is one of a few small old parishes in the area in a civil parish in terms of the third tier of local government, namely Rowlands Castle.

Idsworth remains an ecclesiastical parish in the Church of England, the only place of worship of which is the tenth-century St Huberts Chapel. It has mediaeval paintings on the north wall and surrounding the altar window on the east wall.  It is promoted by the Diocese as an arranged retreat, for seasonal walkers by public footpath, as "the little church in the field".

The place occupies a cross-section of a small valley, centred 1 mile (1.5 km) north of its daughter hamlet and former main manor, much more populous than Idsworth – today considered a village – Finchdean, and 2.3 miles (3.6 km) east of Horndean. It has a long border with West Sussex border. The area is also home to Idsworth house which was built around 1850 to a design by William Burn. It was converted into apartments in 1977.

The nearest railway station is 2.1 miles (3.3 km) south of the village, at Rowlands Castle.

References

External links

Hamlets in Hampshire
Deserted medieval villages in England